

Events

Pre-1600
1111 – Henry V is crowned Holy Roman Emperor.
1204 – Constantinople falls to the Crusaders of the Fourth Crusade, temporarily ending the Byzantine Empire.

1601–1900
1612 – In one of the epic samurai duels in Japanese history, Miyamoto Musashi defeats Sasaki Kojirō at Funajima island.
1613 – Samuel Argall, having captured Pocahontas in Passapatanzy, Virginia, sets off with her to Jamestown with the intention of exchanging her for English prisoners held by her father.
1699 – The Sikh religion is formalised as the Khalsa – the brotherhood of Warrior-Saintsby Guru Gobind Singh in northern India, in accordance with the Nanakshahi calendar.
1742 – George Frideric Handel's oratorio Messiah makes its world premiere in Dublin, Ireland.
1777 – American Revolutionary War: American forces are ambushed and defeated in the Battle of Bound Brook, New Jersey.
1829 – The Roman Catholic Relief Act 1829 gives Roman Catholics in the United Kingdom the right to vote and to sit in Parliament.
1849 – Lajos Kossuth presents the Hungarian Declaration of Independence in a closed session of the National Assembly.
1861 – American Civil War: Fort Sumter surrenders to Confederate forces.
1865 – American Civil War: Raleigh, North Carolina is occupied by Union forces.
1870 – The New York City Metropolitan Museum of Art is founded.
1873 – The Colfax massacre: More than 60 to 150 black men are murdered in Colfax, Louisiana, while surrendering to a mob of former Confederate soldiers and members of the Ku Klux Klan.

1901–present
1909 – The 31 March Incident leads to the overthrow of Sultan Abdul Hamid II.
1919 – Jallianwala Bagh massacre: British Indian Army troops led by Brigadier-General Reginald Dyer kill approx 379-1000 unarmed demonstrators including men and women in Amritsar, India; and approximately 1,500 injured.
1941 – A pact of neutrality between the USSR and Japan is signed.
1943 – World War II: The discovery of mass graves of Polish prisoners of war killed by Soviet forces in the Katyń Forest Massacre is announced, causing a diplomatic rift between the Polish government-in-exile in London and the Soviet Union, which denies responsibility.
  1943   – The Jefferson Memorial is dedicated in Washington, D.C., on the 200th anniversary of President Thomas Jefferson's birth.
1944 – Relations between New Zealand and the Soviet Union are established.
1945 – World War II: German troops kill more than 1,000 political and military prisoners in Gardelegen, Germany.
  1945   – World War II: Soviet and Bulgarian forces capture Vienna.
1948 – In an ambush, 78 Jewish doctors, nurses and medical students from Hadassah Hospital, and a British soldier, are massacred by Arabs in Sheikh Jarrah. This event came to be known as the Hadassah medical convoy massacre. 
1953 – CIA director Allen Dulles launches the mind-control program Project MKUltra.
1958 – American pianist Van Cliburn is awarded first prize at the inaugural International Tchaikovsky Competition in Moscow.
1960 – The United States launches Transit 1-B, the world's first satellite navigation system.
1964 – At the Academy Awards, Sidney Poitier becomes the first African-American male to win the Best Actor award for the 1963 film Lilies of the Field.
1970 – An oxygen tank aboard the Apollo 13 Service Module explodes, putting the crew in great danger and causing major damage to the Apollo command and service module (codenamed "Odyssey") while en route to the Moon.
1972 – The Universal Postal Union decides to recognize the People's Republic of China as the only legitimate Chinese representative, effectively expelling the Republic of China administering Taiwan.
  1972   – Vietnam War: The Battle of An Lộc begins.
1975 – An attack by the Phalangist resistance kills 26 militia members of the Popular Front for the Liberation of Palestine, marking the start of the 15-year Lebanese Civil War.
1976 – The United States Treasury Department reintroduces the two-dollar bill as a Federal Reserve Note on Thomas Jefferson's 233rd birthday as part of the United States Bicentennial celebration.
  1976   – Forty workers die in an explosion at the Lapua ammunition factory, the deadliest accidental disaster in modern history in Finland.
1996 – Two women and four children are killed after Israeli helicopter fired rockets at an ambulance in Mansouri, Lebanon.
1997 – Tiger Woods becomes the youngest golfer to win the Masters Tournament.
2017 – The US drops the largest ever non-nuclear weapon on Nangarhar Province, Afghanistan.

Births

Pre-1600
1229 – Louis II, Duke of Bavaria (d. 1294)
1350 – Margaret III, Countess of Flanders (d. 1405)
1506 – Peter Faber, French priest and theologian, co-founded the Society of Jesus (d. 1546)
1519 – Catherine de' Medici, Italian-French wife of Henry II of France (d. 1589)
1570 – Guy Fawkes, English soldier, member of the Gunpowder Plot (probable; d. 1606)
1573 – Christina of Holstein-Gottorp (d. 1625)
1593 – Thomas Wentworth, 1st Earl of Strafford, English soldier and politician, Lord Lieutenant of Ireland (d. 1641)

1601–1900
1618 – Roger de Rabutin, Comte de Bussy, French author (d. 1693)
1636 – Hendrik van Rheede, Dutch botanist (d. 1691)
1648 – Jeanne Marie Bouvier de la Motte Guyon, French mystic (d. 1717)
1713 – Pierre Jélyotte, French tenor (d. 1797)
1729 – Thomas Percy, Irish bishop and poet (d. 1811)
1732 – Frederick North, Lord North, English politician, Prime Minister of the United Kingdom (d. 1792)
1735 – Isaac Low, American merchant and politician, founded the New York Chamber of Commerce (d. 1791)
1743 – Thomas Jefferson, American lawyer and politician, 3rd President of the United States (d. 1826)
1747 – Louis Philippe II, Duke of Orléans (d. 1793)
1764 – Laurent de Gouvion Saint-Cyr, French general and politician, French Minister of War (d. 1830)
1769 – Thomas Lawrence, English painter and educator (d. 1830)
1771 – Richard Trevithick, Cornish-English engineer and explorer (d. 1833)
1780 – Alexander Mitchell, Irish engineer, invented the Screw-pile lighthouse (d. 1868)
1784 – Friedrich Graf von Wrangel, Prussian field marshal (d. 1877)
1787 – John Robertson, American lawyer and politician (d. 1873)
1794 – Jean Pierre Flourens, French physiologist and academic (d. 1867)
1802 – Leopold Fitzinger, Austrian zoologist and herpetologist (d. 1884)
1808 – Antonio Meucci, Italian-American engineer (d. 1889)
1810 – Félicien David, French composer (d. 1876)
1824 – William Alexander, Irish archbishop, poet, and theologian (d. 1911)
1825 – Thomas D'Arcy McGee, Irish-Canadian journalist and politician (d. 1868)
1828 – Josephine Butler, English feminist and social reformer (d. 1906)
  1828   – Joseph Lightfoot, English bishop and theologian (d. 1889)
1832 – Juan Montalvo, Ecuadorian author and diplomat (d. 1889)
1841 – Louis-Ernest Barrias, French sculptor and academic (d. 1905)
1850 – Arthur Matthew Weld Downing, Irish astronomer (d. 1917)
1851 – Robert Abbe, American surgeon and radiologist (d. 1928)
  1851   – William Quan Judge, Irish occultist and theosophist (d. 1896)
1852 – Frank Winfield Woolworth, American businessman, founded the F. W. Woolworth Company (d. 1919)
1854 – Lucy Craft Laney, American founder of the Haines Normal and Industrial School, Augusta, Georgia (d. 1933)
1860 – James Ensor, English-Belgian painter, an important influence on expressionism and surrealism (d. 1949)
1866 – Butch Cassidy, American criminal (d. 1908)
1872 – John Cameron, Scottish international footballer and manager (d. 1935)
  1872   – Alexander Roda Roda, Austrian-Croatian journalist and author (d. 1945)
1873 – John W. Davis, American lawyer and politician, 14th United States Solicitor General (d. 1955)
1875 – Ray Lyman Wilbur, American physician, academic, and politician, 31st United States Secretary of the Interior (d. 1949)
1879 – Edward Bruce, American lawyer and painter (d. 1943)
  1879   – Oswald Bruce Cooper, American type designer, lettering artist, graphic designer, and educator (d. 1940)
1880 – Charles Christie, Canadian-American businessman, co-founded the Christie Film Company (d. 1955)
1885 – Vean Gregg, American baseball player (d. 1964)
  1885   – Juhan Kukk, Estonian politician, Head of State of Estonia (d. 1942)
  1885   – György Lukács, Hungarian philosopher and critic (d. 1971)
  1885   – Pieter Sjoerds Gerbrandy, Dutch politician (d. 1961)
1887 – Gordon S. Fahrni, Canadian physician and golfer (d. 1995)
1889 – Herbert Yardley, American cryptologist and author (d. 1958)
1890 – Frank Murphy, American jurist and politician, 56th United States Attorney General (d. 1949)
  1890   – Dadasaheb Torne, Indian director and producer (d. 1960)
1891 – Maurice Buckley, Australian sergeant, Victoria Cross recipient (d. 1921)
  1891   – Nella Larsen, Danish/African-American nurse, librarian, and author (d. 1964)
  1891   – Robert Scholl, German accountant and politician (d. 1973)
1892 – Sir Arthur Harris, 1st Baronet, English air marshal (d. 1984)
  1892   – Robert Watson-Watt, Scottish engineer, invented Radar (d. 1973)
1894 – Arthur Fadden, Australian accountant and politician, 13th Prime Minister of Australia (d. 1973)
  1894   – Joie Ray, American runner (d. 1978)
1896 – Fred Barnett, English footballer (d. 1982)
1897 – Werner Voss, German lieutenant and pilot (d. 1917)
1899 – Alfred Mosher Butts, American architect and game designer, created Scrabble (d. 1993)
  1899   – Harold Osborn, American high jumper and decathlete (d. 1975)
1900 – Sorcha Boru, American potter and ceramic sculptor (d. 2006)
  1900   – Pierre Molinier, French painter and photographer (d. 1976)

1901–present
1901 – Jacques Lacan, French psychiatrist and psychoanalyst (d. 1981)
  1901   – Alan Watt, Australian public servant and diplomat, Australian Ambassador to Japan (d. 1988)
1902 – Philippe de Rothschild, French Grand Prix driver, playwright, and producer (d. 1988)
  1902   – Marguerite Henry, American author (d. 1997)
1904 – David Robinson, English businessman and philanthropist (d. 1987)
1905 – Rae Johnstone, Australian jockey (d. 1964)
1906 – Samuel Beckett, Irish novelist, poet, and playwright, Nobel Prize laureate (d. 1989)
  1906   – Bud Freeman, American saxophonist, composer, and bandleader (d. 1991)
1907 – Harold Stassen, American lawyer and politician, 25th Governor of Minnesota (d. 2001)
1909 – Eudora Welty, American short story writer and novelist (d. 2001)
1911 – Ico Hitrec, Croatian footballer and manager (d. 1946)
  1911   – Jean-Louis Lévesque, Canadian businessman and philanthropist (d. 1994)
  1911   – Nino Sanzogno, Italian conductor and composer (d. 1983)
1913 – Dave Albritton, American high jumper and coach (d. 1994)
  1913   – Kermit Tyler, American lieutenant and pilot (d. 2010)
1914 – Orhan Veli Kanık, Turkish poet and author (d. 1950)
1916 – Phyllis Fraser, Welsh-American actress, journalist, and publisher, co-founded Beginner Books (d. 2006)
1917 – Robert Orville Anderson, American businessman, founded Atlantic Richfield Oil Co. (d. 2007)
  1917   – Bill Clements, American soldier, engineer, and politician, 15th United States Deputy Secretary of Defense (d. 2011)
1919 – Roland Gaucher, French journalist and politician (d. 2007)
  1919   – Howard Keel, American actor and singer (d. 2004)
  1919   – Madalyn Murray O'Hair, American activist, founded American Atheists (d. 1995)
1920 – Roberto Calvi, Italian banker (d. 1982)
  1920   – Claude Cheysson, French lieutenant and politician, French Minister of Foreign Affairs (d. 2012)
  1920   – Liam Cosgrave, Irish lawyer and politician, 6th Taoiseach of Ireland (d. 2017)
  1920   – Theodore L. Thomas, American chemical engineer, Patent attorney and writer (d. 2005)
1922 – Heinz Baas, German footballer and manager (d. 1994)
  1922   – John Braine, English librarian and author (d. 1986)
  1922   – Julius Nyerere, Tanzanian politician and teacher, 1st President of Tanzania (d. 1999)
  1922   – Valve Pormeister, Estonian architect (d. 2002)
1923 – Don Adams, American actor and director (d. 2005)
  1923   – A. H. Halsey, English sociologist and academic (d. 2014)
1924 – John T. Biggers, American painter (d. 2001)
  1924   – Jack T. Chick, American author, illustrator, and publisher (d. 2016)
  1924   – Stanley Donen, American film director and choreographer (d. 2019)
1926 – Ellie Lambeti, Greek actress (d. 1983)
  1926   – John Spencer-Churchill, 11th Duke of Marlborough, English businessman (d. 2014)
1927 – Rosemary Haughton, English philosopher, theologian, and author
  1927   – Antonino Rocca, Italian-American wrestler (d. 1977)
  1927   – Maurice Ronet, French actor and director (d. 1983)
1928 – Alan Clark, English historian and politician, Minister of State for Trade (d. 1999)
  1928   – Gianni Marzotto, Italian racing driver and businessman (d. 2012)
1929 – Marilynn Smith, American golfer (d. 2019)
1931 – Anita Cerquetti, Italian soprano (d. 2014)
  1931   – Robert Enrico, French director and screenwriter (d. 2001)
  1931   – Dan Gurney, American race car driver and engineer (d. 2018)
  1931   – Jon Stone, American composer, producer, and screenwriter (d. 1997)
1932 – Orlando Letelier, Chilean-American economist and politician, Chilean Minister of National Defense (d. 1976)
1933 – Ben Nighthorse Campbell, American soldier and politician
1934 – John Muckler, Canadian ice hockey player, coach, and manager (d. 2021)
1936 – Pierre Rosenberg, French historian and academic
1937 – Col Joye, Australian singer-songwriter and guitarist
  1937   – Edward Fox, English actor
  1937   – Lanford Wilson, American playwright, co-founded the Circle Repertory Company (d. 2011)
1938 – Klaus Lehnertz, German pole vaulter
  1938   – John Weston, English poet and diplomat
1939 – Seamus Heaney, Irish poet and playwright, Nobel Prize laureate (d. 2013)
  1939   – Paul Sorvino, American actor and singer (d. 2022)
1940 – Mike Beuttler, Egyptian-English racing driver (d. 1988)
  1940   – Lester Chambers, American singer and musician
  1940   – J. M. G. Le Clézio, Breton French-Mauritian author and academic, Nobel Prize laureate
  1940   – Vladimir Cosma, French composer, conductor and violinist
  1940   – Jim McNab, Scottish footballer (d. 2006)
  1940   – Max Mosley, English racing driver and engineer, co-founded March Engineering, former president of the FIA (d. 2021)
  1940   – Ruby Puryear Hearn, African-American biophysicist
1941 – Michael Stuart Brown, American geneticist and academic, Nobel Prize laureate
  1941   – Jean-Marc Reiser, French author and illustrator (d. 1983)
1942 – Bill Conti, American composer and conductor
1943 – Alan Jones, Australian rugby coach and radio host
  1943   – Tim Krabbé, Dutch journalist and author
  1943   – Philip Norman, English journalist, author, and playwright
1944 – Susan Davis, Russian-American social worker and politician
1945 – Judy Nunn, Australian actress and author
1946 – Al Green, American singer-songwriter, producer, and pastor
1947 – Rae Armantrout, American poet and academic
  1947   – Mike Chapman, Australian-English songwriter and producer
  1947   – Jean-Jacques Laffont, French economist and academic (d. 2004)
  1947   – Thanos Mikroutsikos, Greek composer and politician (d. 2019) 
1948 – Nam Hae-il, South Korean admiral
  1948   – Drago Jančar, Slovenian author and playwright
  1948   – Mikhail Shufutinsky, Soviet and Russian singer, actor, TV presenter
1949 – Len Cook, New Zealand-English mathematician and statistician
  1949   – Frank Doran, Scottish lawyer and politician (d. 2017)
  1949   – Christopher Hitchens, English-American essayist, literary critic, and journalist (d. 2011)
1950 – Ron Perlman, American actor 
  1950   – Tommy Raudonikis, Australian rugby league player and coach (d. 2021)
1951 – Leszek Borysiewicz, Welsh immunologist and academic
  1951   – Peter Davison, English actor
1952 – Gabrielle Gourdeau, Canadian writer (d. 2006)
  1952   – Jonjo O'Neill, Irish jockey and trainer
1955 – Steve Camp, American singer-songwriter and guitarist
  1955   – Muwenda Mutebi II, current King of Buganda Kingdom
1960 – Rudi Völler, German footballer and manager
1963 – Garry Kasparov, Russian chess player and author
1964 – Davis Love III, American golfer and sportscaster
1965 – Patricio Pouchulu, Argentinian architect and educator
1967 – Michael Eisen, American biologist and academic
  1967   – Olga Tañón, Puerto Rican singer-songwriter
1971 – Franck Esposito, French swimmer
  1971   – Danie Mellor, Australian painter and sculptor
1972 – Aaron Lewis, American singer-songwriter and guitarist 
1977 – Margus Tsahkna, Estonian lawyer and politician
1978 – Carles Puyol, Spanish footballer
1982 – Nellie McKay, British-American singer-songwriter, musician, and actress
1987 – John-Allison Weiss, American singer-songwriter
1988 – Allison Williams, American actress and singer
1989 – Josh Reynolds, Australian rugby league player
1993 – Darrun Hilliard, American basketball player

Deaths

Pre-1600
 548 – Lý Nam Đế, Vietnamese emperor (b. 503)
 585 – Hermenegild, Visigothic prince and saint
 799 – Paul the Deacon, Italian monk and historian (b. 720)
 814 – Krum, khan of the Bulgarian Khanate
 862 – Donald I, king of the Picts (b. 812)
 989 – Bardas Phokas, Byzantine general
1035 – Herbert I, Count of Maine
1093 – Vsevolod I of Kiev (b. 1030)
1113 – Ida of Lorraine, saint and noblewoman (b. c. 1040)
1138 – Simon I, Duke of Lorraine (b. 1076)
1213 – Guy of Thouars, regent of Brittany
1275 – Eleanor of England (b. 1215)
1367 – John Tiptoft, 2nd Baron Tibetot (b. 1313)
1592 – Bartolomeo Ammannati, Italian architect and sculptor (b. 1511)

1601–1900
1605 – Boris Godunov, Tsar of Russia (b. 1551)
1612 – Sasaki Kojirō, Japanese samurai (b. 1585)
1635 – Fakhr-al-Din II, Ottoman prince (b. 1572)
1638 – Henri, Duke of Rohan (b. 1579)
1641 – Richard Montagu, English bishop (b. 1577)
1695 – Jean de La Fontaine, French author and poet (b. 1621)
1716 – Arthur Herbert, 1st Earl of Torrington, English admiral and politician (b. 1648)
1722 – Charles Leslie, Irish priest and theologian (b. 1650)
1793 – Pierre Gaspard Chaumette, French botanist, lawyer, and politician (b. 1763)
1794 – Nicolas Chamfort, French playwright and poet (b. 1741)
1826 – Franz Danzi, German cellist, composer, and conductor (b. 1763)
1853 – Leopold Gmelin, German chemist and academic (b. 1788)
  1853   – James Iredell, Jr., American lawyer and politician, 23rd Governor of North Carolina (b. 1788)
1855 – Henry De la Beche, English geologist and palaeontologist (b. 1796)
1868 – Tewodros II of Ethiopia (b. 1818)
1880 – Robert Fortune, Scottish botanist and author (b. 1813)
1882 – Bruno Bauer, German historian and philosopher (b. 1809)
1886 – John Humphrey Noyes, American religious leader, founded the Oneida Community (b. 1811)
1890 – Samuel J. Randall, American captain, lawyer, and politician, 33rd Speaker of the United States House of Representatives (b. 1828)

1901–present
1909 – Whitley Stokes, Anglo-Irish lawyer and scholar (b. 1830)
1910 – William Quiller Orchardson, Scottish-English painter and educator (b. 1835)
1911 – John McLane, Scottish-American politician, 50th Governor of New Hampshire (b. 1852)
  1911   – George Washington Glick, American lawyer and politician, 9th Governor of Kansas (b. 1827)
1912 – Takuboku Ishikawa, Japanese poet and author (b. 1886)
1917 – Diamond Jim Brady, American businessman and philanthropist (b. 1856)
1918 – Lavr Kornilov, Russian general (b. 1870)
1927 – Georg Voigt, German politician, Mayor of Frankfurt (b. 1866)
1936 – Konstantinos Demertzis, Greek politician 129th Prime Minister of Greece (b. 1876)
1938 – Grey Owl, English-Canadian environmentalist and author (b. 1888)
1941 – Annie Jump Cannon, American astronomer and academic (b. 1863)
  1941   – William Twaits, Canadian soccer player (b. 1879)
1942 – Henk Sneevliet, Dutch politician (b. 1883)
  1942   – Anton Uesson, Estonian engineer and politician, 17th Mayor of Tallinn (b. 1879)
1944 – Cécile Chaminade, French pianist and composer (b. 1857)
1945 – Ernst Cassirer, Polish-American philosopher and academic (b. 1874)
1954 – Samuel Jones, American high jumper (b. 1880)
  1954   – Angus Lewis Macdonald, Canadian lawyer and politician, 12th Premier of Nova Scotia (b. 1890)
1956 – Emil Nolde, Danish-German painter and educator (b. 1867)
1959 – Eduard van Beinum, Dutch pianist, violinist, and conductor (b. 1901)
1961 – John A. Bennett, American soldier (b. 1936)
1962 – Culbert Olson, American lawyer and politician, 29th Governor of California (b. 1876)
1966 – Abdul Salam Arif, Iraqi colonel and politician, 2nd President of Iraq (b. 1921)
  1966   – Carlo Carrà, Italian painter (b. 1881)
  1966   – Georges Duhamel, French soldier and author (b. 1884)
1967 – Nicole Berger, French actress (b. 1934)
1969 – Alfred Karindi, Estonian pianist and composer (b. 1901)
1971 – Michel Brière, Canadian ice hockey player (b. 1949)
  1971   – Juhan Smuul, Estonian author, poet, and screenwriter (b. 1921)
1975 – Larry Parks, American actor and singer (b. 1914)
  1975   – François Tombalbaye, Chadian soldier, academic, and politician, 1st President of Chad (b. 1918)
1978 – Jack Chambers, Canadian painter and director (b. 1931)
  1978   – Funmilayo Ransome-Kuti, Nigerian educator and women's rights activist (b. 1900)
1980 – Markus Höttinger, Austrian racing driver (b. 1956)
1983 – Gerry Hitchens, English footballer (b. 1934)
  1983   – Theodore Stephanides, Greek physician, author, and poet (b. 1896)
1984 – Ralph Kirkpatrick, American harpsichordist and musicologist (b. 1911)
1988 – Jean Gascon, Canadian actor and director (b. 1920)
1992 – Maurice Sauvé, Canadian economist and politician (b. 1923)
  1992   – Feza Gürsey, Turkish mathematician and physicist (b. 1921)
  1992   – Daniel Pollock, Australian actor (b. 1968)
1993 – Wallace Stegner, American novelist, short story writer, and essayist (b. 1909)
1996 – Leila Mackinlay, English author and educator (b. 1910)
1997 – Bryant Bowles, American soldier and activist, founded the National Association for the Advancement of White People (b. 1920)
  1997   – Alan Cooley, Australian public servant (b. 1920)
  1997   – Dorothy Frooks, American author and actress (b. 1896)
  1997   – Voldemar Väli, Estonian wrestler (b. 1903) 
1998 – Patrick de Gayardon, French skydiver and base jumper (b. 1960)
1999 – Ortvin Sarapu, Estonian-New Zealand chess player and author (b. 1924)
  1999   – Willi Stoph, German engineer and politician, 2nd Prime Minister of East Germany (b. 1914)
2000 – Giorgio Bassani, Italian author and poet (b. 1916)
  2000   – Frenchy Bordagaray, American baseball player and manager (b. 1910)
2004 – Caron Keating, Northern Irish television host (b. 1962)
2005 – Johnnie Johnson, American pianist and songwriter (b. 1924)
  2005   – Phillip Pavia, American painter and sculptor (b. 1912)
2006 – Muriel Spark, Scottish novelist, poet, and critic (b. 1918)
2008 – John Archibald Wheeler, American physicist and academic (b. 1911)
2012 – Cecil Chaudhry, Pakistani pilot, academic, and activist (b. 1941)
  2012   – Shūichi Higurashi, Japanese illustrator (b. 1936)
2013 – Stephen Dodgson, English composer and educator (b. 1924)
2014 – Ernesto Laclau, Argentinian-Spanish philosopher and theorist (b. 1935)
  2014   – Michael Ruppert, American journalist and author (b. 1951)
2015 – Eduardo Galeano, Uruguayan journalist and author (b. 1940)
  2015   – Günter Grass, German novelist, poet, playwright, and illustrator, Nobel Prize laureate (b. 1927)
  2015   – Herb Trimpe, American author and illustrator (b. 1939)
2017 – Dan Rooney, American football executive and former United States Ambassador to Ireland (b. 1932)
2022 – Michel Bouquet, French stage and film actor (b. 1925)
2022 – Gloria Parker, American musician and bandleader (b.1921)

Holidays and observances
 Christian feast day:
 Hermenegild
 Blessed Ida of Louvain
 Pope Martin I
 April 13 (Eastern Orthodox liturgics)

References

External links

 BBC: On This Day
 
 Historical Events on April 13

Days of the year
April